Minuscule 182 (in the Gregory-Aland numbering), ε 409 (Soden), is a Greek minuscule manuscript of the New Testament, on parchment. Paleographically it has been assigned to the 14th century. Scrivener dated it to the 12th century. 
It has marginalia.

Description 

The codex contains a complete text of the four Gospels on 226 elegant parchment leaves (size ). The text is written in one column per page, in 24 lines per page, in black and dark-brown ink, the capital letters in colours.

Text 

The Greek text of the codex is a representative of the Byzantine text-type. Aland placed it in Category V. According to the Claremont Profile Method it belongs to the textual family Kr in Luke 1. In Luke 10 and Luke 20 it represents textual family Πa as a weak member of this family.

History 

It is dated by the INTF to the 12th century.

The manuscript was examined by Birch, Scholz, and Burgon. C. R. Gregory saw it in 1886.

It is currently housed at the Laurentian Library (Plutei. VI. 11), at Florence.

See also 
 List of New Testament minuscules
 Biblical manuscript
 Textual criticism

References

Further reading 

 

Greek New Testament minuscules
14th-century biblical manuscripts